Roberto Vallejo (born 1 June 1935) is a Mexican wrestler. He competed in the men's freestyle featherweight at the 1960 Summer Olympics.

References

External links
 

1935 births
Living people
Mexican male sport wrestlers
Olympic wrestlers of Mexico
Wrestlers at the 1960 Summer Olympics
People from Salvatierra, Guanajuato
Pan American Games medalists in wrestling
Pan American Games silver medalists for Mexico
Wrestlers at the 1959 Pan American Games
Wrestlers at the 1967 Pan American Games
20th-century Mexican people
21st-century Mexican people